Condemnation may refer to:

 Damnation, the antithesis of salvation
 The act of eminent domain which refers to the power of a government to take private property for public use
 "Condemnation" (song), a 1993 song by Depeche Mode
 Condemnation (novel), a 2003 fantasy novel by Richard Baker

See also
 The Condemnations of 1210–1277, a series of condemnations or restrictions on certain medieval teachings at the University of Paris
 Condemned (disambiguation)